Mont-Saint-Léger is a commune in the Haute-Saône department in the region of Bourgogne-Franche-Comté in eastern France.

References

Communes of Haute-Saône